The president of the Legislative Council is the presiding officer of the Legislative Council of Hong Kong. According to the Article 71 of the Hong Kong Basic Law, the president of the Legislative Council is elected by and from among Legislative Council members, plays the presiding role, administrative role and ceremonial role, and ensures the smooth conduct of the Legislative Council meetings.

History
From the establishment of the council in 1843 to 1993, the president of the Legislative Council of Hong Kong was the governor. In 1991, a deputy president, John Joseph Swaine, was appointed by the governor from among the non-official members to chair the sittings. The governor remained president and member, but systematically absented himself from most of the sittings. In February 1993, the governor ceased to be member and president of the council. The presidency was handed over to a member elected from among the unofficial members.

Eligibility
Under the current system, the president shall be a Chinese citizen and permanent resident of Hong Kong SAR of not less than 40 years of age, with no right of abode in any foreign country and has ordinarily resided in Hong Kong for continuous period of not less than 20 years.

Roles
Under the Article 66 to 79 in the Basic Law, the Legislative Council Commission Ordinance , the Legislative Council (Powers and Privileges) Ordinance  and the Rules of Procedure of the Legislative Council of Hong Kong Special Administrative Region (RoP), the President performs the following roles in the council:

Presiding role
 The president presides over council meetings and ensures that businesses are transacted in an orderly way during the council meetings. In the absence of the president, the chairman of the House Committee serves as deputy to the president.
 The president determines the day and hours of the meetings and may change the agenda, suspend a meeting, or call a special meeting, or adjourn the Legislative Council.
 The president shall call emergency meetings at the request of the chief executive.
 The president is responsible for the observance of the rules of order in the Legislative Council. Decisions on a point of order shall be final.

Primacy of President
In a controversial move directed at reining in democratic legislators (most of whom were elected by universal suffrage and six of whose seats had been vacated by a controversial court order of disqualification), amendments to the Rules of Procedure were passed on 15 December 2017 giving sweeping powers to the president to control the business of the legislature. Among them is the power to vet proposed motions and amendments to bills, require legislators to explain them and to reject or merge them. Prior notice must be given of any notice of motion and the .resident may reconvene the chamber immediately after any failure to meet quorum. Under the undemocratic election system of the legislature, the role of president has been occupied by a pro-Beijing legislator since 1 July 1997.

Administrative role
The president is also the chairman of the Legislative Council Commission, a statutory body and provides administrative support and services for the Legislative Council and its members through the Legislative Council secretariat.

The Legislative Council Commission determines the organization and administration of support services and facilities, formulate and execute policies on their effective operation and expand funds in ways it see fit to support these activities.

Ceremonial role
The president is accorded the sixth place in the official precedence list following the chief executive, the chief justice of the Court of Final Appeal, the chief secretary for Administration, the financial secretary and the secretary for justice. He or she is the representative of the Legislative Council on ceremonial and formal occasions.

List of presidents

British Colonial period (1843–1941)

Before 1993, the Legislative Council was presided over by the Governor of Hong Kong.

Japanese occupation period (1941–1945)
From 25 December 1941 to 30 August 1945, the office was suspended due to the Japanese Occupation of Hong Kong. The representative advisory bodies during the time were the Chinese Representative Council and Chinese Cooperative Council.

Restoration to British rule (1946–1997) 

Until 1993, the legislative council was presided over by the governor of Hong Kong. Between 1991 and 1993, a deputy president, John Joseph Swaine, was appointed by the then-governor David Wilson to chair the meetings in his absence. The governor then only attended the first session in October every year to present his policy address and gave a farewell speech to the members of the council before he left office. The president was elected among non-official members of the legislative council from 1993 onwards after the last governor Chris Patten having given up the presidency that year.

Provisional Legislative Council (1997–1998)

SAR Legislative Council (1998–present)

References

Hong Kong
President
Positions of the Hong Kong Government
President
Political office-holders in Hong Kong